[[File:Francesco podesti, ritratto di antonio bonfigli.jpg|thumb|Francesco Podesti, Ritratto di Antonio Bonfigli - Musei civici di Palazzo Buonaccorsi]]

Antonio Bonfigli (1806-1865) was an Italian painter, architect, and miniaturist.

Antonio was born in Macerata, and studied there first under Atanasio Favini. In 1826, he moved to Rome to study under Vincenzo Camuccini and then Ferdinando Cavalleri. Antonio developed a practice in Rome, restoring old canvases and creating illuminated manuscripts. He participated in the Exposition of the Accademia Ligustica with some of his manuscripts and copies of ancient works. In 1860, upon returning to his native Macerata, the helped found the local Pinacoteca Civica. In the galleries, two of his canvases, a copy of The Transfiguration (original by Raphael) and Portrait of Pius VII'' are on display. He died in Macerata.

References

1806 births
1865 deaths
People from Macerata
19th-century Italian painters
Italian male painters
19th-century Italian male artists